The Kalaus is a north-flowing river on the Black Sea-Caspian Steppe of southern Russia, in Stavropol Krai. It is a tributary of the Manych. Formerly, when it reached the Manych, part of its waters would flow east and part west. Today a low dam blocks flow into the East Manych.

References

External links 
 Article in the Great Soviet Encyclopedia

Rivers of Stavropol Krai